Cruden Bay Junior Football Club are a Scottish football club from the village of Cruden Bay, Aberdeenshire. Members of the Scottish Junior Football Association, they currently play in the North Second Division. Founded in 1934 as an Amateur side, they stepped up to the Junior grade in 1995. The club are based at Watson Park, formerly known as Bayfield Park, and the club's colour is purple.

Honours
 North East Division One winners: 1997–98, 1999–00
 North Region Division One (West) winners: 2013–14
 Duthie (Acorn Heating) Cup: 1999–00
 Morrison Trophy: 1997–98, 1999–00

External links
 Club website
 Facebook
 Twitter
 Scottish Football Historical Archive
 Non-League Scotland

Football in Aberdeenshire
Football clubs in Scotland
Scottish Junior Football Association clubs
Association football clubs established in 1934
1934 establishments in Scotland